Janette Lane Bradbury (born June 17, 1938) is an American actress and writer.

Biography
Lane Bradbury was born in Buckhead, Morgan County, Georgia, near Atlanta. She studied ballet as a young girl. In the 1950s, she moved to New York City, and was admitted to the Actors Studio.

Career
Bradbury made her Broadway debut in J.B., performing alongside Raymond Massey and Christopher Plummer. She starred in Tennessee Williams' play Night of the Iguana with veteran actress Bette Davis. Bradbury was the first actress to play Dainty June in the original Broadway production of Gypsy.

In the late 1960s, she relocated with her husband, actor and director Lou Antonio, to Los Angeles, where she began a long career in television. In 1965, Bradbury and Antonio co-starred in an episode of Gunsmoke ("Outlaw's Woman"). She was in 1963's season three opener of The Fugitive titled "Wings of an Angel", playing  Janet Kegler, a woman taken hostage. She was most active in the 1970s, making guest appearances on shows such as The Rockford Files, The Mod Squad, Medical Center, Mannix, The Partridge Family, Owen Marshall, Counselor at Law, The Waltons, and Kung Fu.  She was popular in repeat-appearances as Merry Florene on Gunsmoke.

Her film credits include The Ultimate Warrior and Alice Doesn't Live Here Anymore. She appeared in the popular television movies Maybe I'll Come Home in the Spring and To Dance with the White Dog.

Television

Personal life
In 1965, Bradbury married actor and director Lou Antonio and they had two daughters.  The couple divorced in 1980. Their daughter Elkin Antoniou is a writer, director, and award-winning documentarian.

She is the founder and artistic director of the Valkyrie Theater of Dance, Drama, and Film, a nonprofit organization whose purpose is to introduce at-risk teens to the theatrical arts.

References

External links

Actors Studio alumni
American film actresses
American television actresses
1938 births
Living people
Actresses from Atlanta
20th-century American actresses
American stage actresses
21st-century American women